is a role-playing video game developed and published by Konami for the Family Computer. The game was released exclusively in Japan on April 26, 1991. The title of the game references Lagrangian points, the five positions in space where a body of negligible mass could be placed which would then maintain its position relative to two existing massive bodies.

Lagrange Point has the distinction of being one of only two games ever released with Konami's Virtual ROM Controller VII (VRC7) sound generator integrated circuit, which allowed for a drastic improvement in the quality of the music and sound effects used in the game. The game was never localized for western audiences, however an unofficial English translation was released in 2014 by Aeon Genesis.

Gameplay

Plot 
In the 22nd century, mankind has begun to emigrate into outer space. Constructed at a Lagrange point were three huge space colonies: the Isis Cluster; two artificial biospheres, named Land-1 and Land-2, and a satellite. In the year Isis 0024 (55 years after the cluster was constructed), a biohazard outbreak occurred on Land-2. All attempts at contact were met with nothing but static. Now a research team led by their pilot,  approaches Land-1.

Upon arrival, the team was attacked by a group of robots and the shuttle exploded due to the damage during the battle, knocking Gene out immediately after.

Gene then awakened in the medical center of Isis City to find one of his team members fatally wounded. Said team member informs Gene that their goal was to find  a researcher at Land-2's Bio Research Lab, and Gene sets off to find him, wherever he is in Land-2.

Development and release

Reception

Notes

References

External links 
 Lagrange Point at GameFAQs
 Lagrange Point at MobyGames

1991 video games
Japan-exclusive video games
Konami games
Nintendo Entertainment System games
Nintendo Entertainment System-only games
Science fiction video games
Video games scored by Aki Hata
Video games developed in Japan